Business association may refer to:
Company law, or the law of business associations: often used for United States corporate law
Trade association
Chamber of commerce